The Quinta Vergara Amphitheater is an open-air amphitheater within the Parque Quinta Vergara in Viña del Mar, Chile. The amphitheater is the site of the Viña del Mar International Song Festival held yearly in February. The venue is owned by the Viña del Mar Municipality.

History 

After the success of the first Viña del Mar International Song Festival in 1960, it was decided to replace the stage with a more stable one. In 1963 the architect Hernando López began the construction of the venue, which would be a wood structure that was like an "acoustic shell" that helped the artist to project the sound to the audience and to protect the artists from the elements.

In 2002 the amphitheater was renovated by replacing the wooden shell structure with a concrete structure. This structure is the one that is currently standing. With this renovation, the capacity of the amphitheater was upgraded from 15,000 to 20,000 (which is the current capacity).

See also 
 List of contemporary amphitheatres

External links 
 History of the amphitheater (in Spanish)

Amphitheaters
Buildings and structures in Valparaíso Region
Music venues in Chile
Tourist attractions in Valparaíso Region